Zhang Li may refer to:

Zhang Li (Liao dynasty) (died 947), Later Tang and Liao dynasty official
Zhang Li (entrepreneur) (born 1953), Chinese entrepreneur and billionaire
Zhang Li (director) (born 1954), Chinese cinematographer and director
Zhang Li, a fictional character in the video game franchise Perfect Dark
Zhang Li (actress) (张俪, born 1984), Chinese actress
Li Zhang (biologist), American biologist

Sportspeople

Javelin throw
Zhang Li (javelin thrower, born 1961), Chinese javelin thrower
Zhang Li (javelin thrower, born 1978), Chinese javelin thrower
Zhang Li (javelin thrower, born 1989), Chinese javelin thrower

Association football
Zhang Li (footballer, born February 1989), Chinese footballer who played for the clubs Chongqing, Chengdu and Jiangxi
Zhang Li (footballer, born August 1989), Chinese footballer who played for the clubs Henan and Wuhan

Others
Zhang Li (table tennis) (born 1951), Chinese table tennis player
Zhang Li (speed skater) (born 1963), Chinese speed skater
Zhang Li (handballer) (born 1976), Chinese handball player
Zhang Li (baseball) (born 1980), Chinese baseball player
Zhang Li (fencer) (born 1981), Chinese épée fencer
Zhang Li (swimmer) (born 1998), Chinese Paralympic swimmer